Camille Janclaire Mitchell is an actress, writer and director.

Born in Los Angeles and raised in Canada, she is the daughter of Cameron Mitchell and trained at the University of British Columbia, Vancouver and at The Royal Central School of Speech and Drama, London. She studied documentary filmmaking at Capilano University and pursued her MFA at Loyola Marymount University's School of TV and Film.

Her work onstage, including the Shaw and Stratford Festivals, has been critically acclaimed and she has won one of Canada's Jessie Awards for her performance as Ariel in The Tempest.

A 2021 Leo Award Nominee for Supporting Lead in a Television Film for  "Ships in the Night", she is perhaps best known on television for her role as Sheriff Nancy Adams on Smallville, for which she was nominated for a Leo Award for Best Supporting Performance by a Female in a Dramatic Series. For her recurring role on ABC's "Somewhere Between", she received a 2018 Leo Award nomination and she has been nominated for a 2019 Leo for Best Guest Performance by a Female in a Dramatic Series for her performance in "Van Helsing: I Awake". As a writer/director, her short films, A Mother's Love and "By The Fountain" have earned several international accolades.

Partial filmography

References

External links

Camille Mitchell profile, NorthernStars.ca; accessed February 17, 2018.

Living people
American people of Canadian descent
American television actresses
Canadian people of American descent
Canadian television actresses
Canadian women screenwriters
American film directors
Canadian film directors
Alumni of the Royal Central School of Speech and Drama
Actresses from Los Angeles
Screenwriters from California
1954 births
21st-century Canadian women writers
21st-century Canadian screenwriters